"Haunted" is a song originally recorded by the Australian pop vocal group Human Nature for their 2004 album Walk the Tightrope. In 2007 the song was covered by the German pop quartet Room 2012 and released as the first single from their debut album, Elevator. The Room 2012 version charted at number 10 in Germany, 21 in Austria and 23 in Switzerland.

2007 singles
Room 2012 songs
2004 songs
Songs written by Vincent DeGiorgio